The Women's Suffrage National Monument is a forthcoming monument that will honor suffragists who organized and demonstrated for the women's right to vote in the United States.

The Women's Suffrage National Monument Foundation is leading efforts to build the monument. The Foundation was founded in 2018 and, in 2020, was authorized by an act of Congress to oversee the establishment of the monument.

First ladies Rosalynn Carter, Laura Bush, Hillary Rodham Clinton, Michelle Obama, Melania Trump, and Jill Biden are honorary chairs of the Foundation. The Foundation's Executive Director is Anna Laymon.

In October 2022, Monument supporters began lobbying Congress to garner support for construction of the monument on the National Mall in Washington, DC.

See also 

 Turning Point Suffrage Memorial
 Belmont–Paul Women's Equality National Monument

References 

National monuments and memorials
Monuments and memorials to women's suffrage in the United States

External links 
 Women's Suffrage National Monument Foundation
 Public Law 116–217 116th Congress